WJBC may refer to:

 WJBC (AM), a radio station (1230 AM) licensed to Bloomington, Illinois, United States
 WJBC-FM, a radio station (93.7 FM) licensed to Pontiac, Illinois, United States